Nigel Greaves (born c. 1960) is an English actor.

He has had several roles in television over the years, including a rude waiter in Tales of the Unexpected (A Man With A Fortune),his longest-running role was in The Kids from 47A. He also appeared in Coronation Street.

He played John, Duke of Berry in Kenneth Branagh's film of Henry V.

Filmography

External links 

Living people
British male child actors
British male television actors
Year of birth missing (living people)
British male film actors